Bangana gedrosicus is a species of cyprinid fish endemic to Pakistan and Iran where it is only found in the Mashkel River drainage in Baluchistan.

References 

 

Bangana
Freshwater fish of Pakistan
Endemic fauna of Pakistan
Fish described in 1912
Taxa named by Erich Zugmayer